Shai Hulud is an American metalcore band formed in Pompano Beach, Florida, in 1995, and later based in Poughkeepsie, New York. The band is named after the giant sandworms in Frank Herbert's novel Dune.

The two mainstay members of Shai Hulud are considered to be Matt Fox (guitar), who writes most of the band's musical and lyrical output, and Matt Fletcher (originally guitar, now bass), who assists in writing.

History

Early years (1995–1997)
Matt Fox (guitar) and Dave Silber (bass) formed Shai Hulud in 1995 with Damien Moyal (formerly of Culture) on vocals, Jason Lederman on drums, and Oliver Chapoy on guitar. "Matt was playing in several other kinds of bands like rock bands and they just wanted to play some hardcore" says former bassist Jared Allen. However, things with Jason Lederman didn't work out and the band began to look for a new drummer. This, unfortunately, would be something the band would become accustomed to. In 1994, Steve Kleisath and Matt Fox met for the first time in Tampa, FL, when Matt was filling in on drums for Strongarm, the band Steve later joined as drummer. With a complete lineup intact, the band recorded a six-song demo and was soon signed to Revelation Records by Rob Moran, bass player of Unbroken, who received their demo from Jeanne Probart, a friend that worked in Revelation's mail-order department. Although Revelation loved the Shai Hulud demo, they asked the band to change the name because they thought "it was too difficult to remember". Shai Hulud's first show was a Halloween party, played on October 31, 1995, at Discount's warehouse for under 50 people.

Moyal quit the band shortly after the band signed to Revelation Records in early 1996 and went on to play in Morning Again, Bird of Ill Omen and As Friends Rust. With Moyal's exit, Shai Hulud recruited fourteen year old Chad Gilbert on vocals; Gilbert had been recommended by Moyal at the time of his departure. The band had a record deal with Revelation Records' subsidiary, Crisis Records. In September 1996, they recorded a three-song EP called A Profound Hatred Of Man which was released in February 1997. On the first 5000 copies of their debut EP, the band's name is misspelled on the spine as, "Shai Halud", but spelled correctly on the cover. This EP started the legacy of Shai Hulud.

Hearts Once Nourished with Hope and Compassion (1997–2003)
Chad Gilbert departed to found the pop punk band New Found Glory in 1997. This would pose problems for Shai Hulud in the future. However, they started recording their first full-length, Hearts Once Nourished with Hope and Compassion, in August 1997. They would finish the album in September and release it in November. Throughout the next year and a half Shai Hulud toured America with Strongarm, Bloodlet, Shadows Fall, Zao, Overcast, Cannibal Corpse and Disembodied. A limited edition vinyl of the album was released in 2006, and featured a cover painting by Dan Henk.

In May 1998 three tracks were recorded for a split with New York's Indecision entitled The Fall of Every Man. The split was released in November 1998. As Shai Hulud's popularity grew some of the band's members' interest began to wane. In January 1999, Oliver Chapoy decided to leave the band. He was replaced by Matthew Fletcher who later moved to Florida to join the band in February 1999. Matt Fletcher had seen Shai Hulud for the first time in Seattle, Washington in 1997 with Strongarm and NineIronSpitFire. Andrew Gormley (future Shai Hulud drummer) was also at the show selling Kiss It Goodbye demos. Poison the Well drummer Chris Hornbrook filled in for a single show in February 1999 before Gormley joined. In June 1999, they recorded a cover of "Fearless Vampire Killers" for the Bad Brains tribute compilation called Never Give In.

Steve Kleisath quit the band due to personal issues, and Chad Gilbert decided to leave Shai Hulud and become a full-time guitar player for the band New Found Glory. The band forged ahead and recruited Andrew Gormley to fill in as drummer on a European tour. Matt Fletcher filled in as singer until Geert van der Velde joined the band during the tour. The band returned to Florida determined to continue Shai Hulud. However, Dave Silber had been ready to quit and did so upon their return. In January 2000, Jared Allen, Matt Fletcher's friend from Oklahoma, would fill in the bass player position and quickly joined the band in the studio. Three tracks would be recorded for a split with the band Another Victim named A Whole New Level of Sickness. This and another split, honoring Metallica, were both released in March 2000. Shai Hulud shared the Metallica tribute split, named Crush 'Em All Vol. 1, with Boy Sets Fire, covering the song Damage Inc. Spikey Goldbach would fill in as drummer for the A Whole New Level Of Sickness split and Steve Kleisath would return for the sole track on the Crush 'Em All Vol. 1 split for Undecided Records. In April 2000, the band relocated to Poughkeepsie, NY. Chris Cardinal, who used to play for Inner Dam, joined the band to fill in on drums, but he later decided to leave the band.

That Within Blood Ill-Tempered (2003–2006)

In 2002, Jared Allen decided to leave the band, and Matt Fletcher moved on to bass. The band recorded a second full-length That Within Blood Ill-Tempered, released on May 20, 2003. The album peaked at number 39 on the Billboard Top Independent albums chart, without any video or radio airplay. Throughout the creation of the new album, the band continued to search for a permanent drummer. Tony Tintari joined the band in the studio while recording the new album. 
After the release of That Within Blood Ill-Tempered, Shai Hulud picked up guitarist Matt Canning and embarked on a number of international tours. After some time, Shai Hulud and vocalist Geert van der Velde mutually decided it was for the best he leave the band. Geert left and soon thereafter started his solo project The Black Atlantic, and to join as vocalist for the metalcore band Miscreants. Drummer Tony Tintari left the band to join the indie rock band Holy Roman Empire. Guitarist Matt Canning left the band to start The Twilight Collective. Andrew Gormley rejoined on drums for some time and the band played a series of shows with Chad Gilbert on vocals before taking a hiatus to regroup.
Acknowledging some people may misinterpret the parting as the end of Shai Hulud, the band came out on their homepage indicating that they would not be breaking up; instead, the band would change name to "The Warmth of Red Blood" and continue what had been started with Shai Hulud. They started requesting that anyone who considered themselves up for the challenge of taking over vocal duties record a demo of themselves performing the track "Whether to Cry or Destroy" (quite similar to what The Dillinger Escape Plan did when auditioning new vocalists). In 2005 The band released a retrospective release entitled, A Comprehensive Retrospective: Or How I Learned to Stop Worrying and Release Bad and Useless Recordings containing rare demos and live tracks!

Misanthropy Pure (2006–2009)
In early 2006, the band recorded a three song rough demo with Eric Dellon on lead vocals and drums, featuring former vocalist Geert van der Velde on backup vocals. In March 2006, the band announced they were abandoning the moniker "The Warmth of Red Blood" and keeping the name Shai Hulud. In August 2006, the band signed with Metal Blade Records. The band recorded their third full-length album Misanthropy Pure at Silver Bullet Media in Connecticut with Matt Mazzali on vocals and Andrew Gormley on drums; the album features additional vocalists such as J Costa of Thy Will Be Done. Released on May 27, 2008, the album peaked at number 35 on the Billboard Top Independent albums chart and 15 on the Top Heatseekers chart. For a number of months, Shai Hulud enlisted the help of former Unearth & The Red Chord drummer Mike Justain up until he joined the band Trap Them. The position of second guitar was filled by Chad Kishick of Miami, Florida, until 2009 when he left the band. Geert Van der Velde temporally returned as vocalist for the band for the 2009 Japan tour, with Parkway Drive and Crystal Lake.

The band released a split EP with New Found Glory titled Not Without a Heart Once Nourished by Sticks and Stones Within Blood Ill-Tempered Misanthropy Pure Gold Can Stay being sold only at the "Not Without a Fight" tour. There are two colors limited to a total of only 500 copies and only for sale from either Shai Hulud or New Found Glory at these shows.

Reach Beyond the Sun (2011–present)
On January 26, 2011, the band announced that they would embark on a 17-day US tour, beginning on the February 2, 2011 to the 19. Shai Hulud is currently in the studio recording a new album. Which is being produced by former vocalist and guitarist of New Found Glory: Chad Gilbert. More recently, August 9, 2012, the band has been announced as an artist touring Australia as part of the annual Soundwave Festival. Details on who will be performing vocals for this tour have yet to be released. They will complete the Australian tour with the festival in early to mid March 2013. The band has also expressed interest in completing as many Sidewaves as possible, shows which would see them play in smaller and more personal venues than the festival itself. Along with this comes a statement via Facebook suggesting that they will be returning to Australia once again, after this festival has been completed, perhaps for the launch tour of their forthcoming album. On September 13, 2012, Matt Fox announced that not only did former member Chad Gilbert produce their forthcoming album, he also supplied the vocals for it as well. On November 19, the band announced the new album's name, Reach Beyond the Sun and a 30-second teaser on YouTube. In December 2015, the band released an EP entitled Just Can't Hate Enough.

Characteristics

Genre
The band is known within the hardcore scene for their affecting, well-written lyrics, whose themes range from misanthropy, hatred, human psychology to hope and compassion, and their often complex compositions, utilizing elements of hardcore punk, heavy, thrash and progressive metal.

Shai Hulud was one of the first hardcore/metal crossover band that used the term "metalcore" to describe their music (as shown in the back cover of That Within Blood Ill-Tempered) and by some fans the band is still considered to be "a true metalcore band", while others, including band members have discarded the term due to their current meaning, e.g., the melodic death metal influenced metalcore, when this genre became a commercial success in early 2000s as "metalcore" and it differed from what the band was playing at that time.

In a more recent interview Fox stated that "progressive hardcore" was the best way to describe the band, rather that stick to a one specific genre.

Influences and legacy
Shai Hulud has become a very influential band in the underground hardcore, metalcore and post-hardcore scene. Bands like 7 Angels 7 Plagues, Alove for Enemies, As Hope Dies, As I Lay Dying, Behind Crimson Eyes, It Prevails, Many Men Have Tried, Misery Signals, Mychildren Mybride, Poison the Well, See You Next Tuesday, Silverstein, The Funeral Pyre, The Banner and Unearth, have cited Shai Hulud as an influence.

They cite their influences as Raw Power, Burn, Chain of Strength, Deadguy, J.F.A., Metallica, NOFX, S.F.A., Strongarm, Testament, Turning Point, Embodiment 12:14, Uniform Choice and Voivod.

Religion and beliefs
Shai Hulud is neither a Christian band nor straight edge, as stated by the band:

Side projects

Zombie Apocalypse

Shai Hulud also have a side project named Zombie Apocalypse (formerly called Boddicker), whose sound can be summed up as a faster, more chaotic and more manic version of its mother band. It features Matt Fox, Matthew Fletcher, Ronen Kaufman, Eric Dellon and Greg Thomas.

The Fremen Warriors

The Fremen Warriors (another reference to Dune) are a group who provide the backing vocals on all of Shai Hulud's releases. Their names are not listed in any of the liner notes, but on the song "Faithless Is He Who Says Farewell When The Road Darkens," they consisted of Aaron Bedard, Nick Brunson, Nicole Prizio, Kelly Reaves, and Paul Romanko.

Band members

Current members
Matt Fox – guitar, backing vocals (1995–present)
"Mad" Matt Fletcher – bass (2002–present; 2013–present studio only), guitar (1999–2002), lead vocals (1999)
Moe Watson – drums (2015–present)
Mark Gumbrecht – guitar (2013–2015, 2019–present)
Eric Dellon – bass, backing vocals (2020–present), lead vocals, drums (2005–2006)
Jay Pepito – lead vocals (2020–present)

Former members
Damien Moyal – lead vocals (1995–1996)
Dave Silber – bass (1995–1999)
Jason Lederman – drums (1995)
Oliver Chapoy – guitar (1996–1998)
Chad Gilbert – lead vocals (1996–1998, 2004; touring, 2012–2013)
Steve Kleisath – drums (1996–1999)
Chris Hornbrook – drums (1999)
Andrew Gormley – drums (1999–2000, 2004–2005, 2006–2008)
Geert van der Velde – lead vocals (1999–2003, 2003–2005, 2009; touring)
Spikey Goldbach – drums (2000–2001)
Jared Allen – bass (2000–2002)
Chris Cardinal – drums (2002)
Tony Tintari – drums (2002–2004)
Dane Metcalfe – guitar (2003)
Matt Canning – guitar (2003–2006)
Matt Mazzali – lead vocals (2006–2009, 2015)
Gregory Thomas – guitar (2007–2008)
Chaz Kishick – guitar (2008–2009)
CJ Crowley – guitar (2009)
Tim O'Leary – guitar (2009–2010) 
Matt Covey – drums (2009–2013)
Mike Moynihan – lead vocals (2009–2012)
Justin Kraus – lead vocals (2013–2014)

Former touring musicians
Steve Bucala – guitar (2002)
Pierce Webster – lead vocals (2003–2004)
Ryan Burns – guitar (2005–2006)
Brian Go – drums (2006)
Shane Shook – drums (2008)
Mike Justian – drums (2009)
Aaron Goodrich – drums (2009–2010)
Steve Muczynski – bass (2009–2010, 2013)
Tony DelMonego – guitar (2011–2012)
Justin Shepp – bass (2012–2013)
Thomas "Tam-Tam" Colello – guitar (2012–2014)
Nathan Gluck – bass (2013)
Rick Maldonado – bass (2013)
Eric English – bass (2013–2014)
Dave Joyal – drums (2013–2015)
Billy Nottke – bass (2014–2015)
Mike – bass (2015)
Eddie Collins – guitar (2015)
John Abernathy – guitar (2015)
Dustin Albright – bass (2015–2016)
Stefan Hojnacki – guitar (2016)
Mike Carlock – lead vocals (2016)
Joshua Lozano – guitar (2016–2019)
"Mean" Pete Kowalsky – lead vocals (2016–2020)

Timeline

Discography

Studio albums
Hearts Once Nourished with Hope and Compassion (1997)
That Within Blood Ill-Tempered (2003)
Misanthropy Pure (2008)
Reach Beyond the Sun (2013)

References

External links 

Official Shai Hulud web site
Shai Hulud on Metal Blade Records website
Shai Hulud on Revelation Records website

 
American progressive metal musical groups
Metalcore musical groups from Florida
Metalcore musical groups from New York (state)
Musical groups from Pompano Beach, Florida
Musical groups from Poughkeepsie, New York
Musical groups established in 1995
Trustkill Records artists
Good Life Recordings artists
Undecided Records artists
Metal Blade Records artists
Revelation Records artists
No Sleep Records artists